The 1966–67 Divizia B was the 27th season of the second tier of the Romanian football league system.

The format has been maintained to two series, each of them having 14 teams. At the end of the season the winners of the series promoted to Divizia A and the last two places from each series relegated to Divizia C.

Team changes

To Divizia B
Promoted from Divizia C
 Chimia Suceava
 Metrom Brașov
 CFR Timișoara
 Unirea Dej

Relegated from Divizia A
 Crișul Oradea
 Siderurgistul Galați

From Divizia B
Relegated to Divizia C
 CFR Roșiori
 Recolta Carei
 Metalul Trgoviște
 Arieșul Turda

Promoted to Divizia A
 Progresul București
 Jiul Petrila

Renamed teams 
Știința București was renamed as Politehnica București.

League tables

Serie I

Serie II

See also 

 1966–67 Divizia A

References

Liga II seasons
Romania
2